Parakonarus kopure is a species of tanaidomorphan malacostracan crustacean found in New Zealand.

References

Further reading
Morales-Nunez, Andres G., Richard W. Heard, and Monica Alfaro. "A new species of Pseudoleptochelia Lang, 1973 (Crustacea: Peracarida: Tanaidacea: Leptocheliidae) from the Northwest Atlantic with observations on the status of the genus." Zootaxa 3664.2 (2013): 259–282.
Kakui, Keiichi, and Saowapa Angsupanich. "Birdotanais songkhlaensis, a new genus and species of Nototanaidae (Crustacea: Tanaidacea) from Thailand."The Raffles Bulletin of Zoology 60.2 (2012): 421–432.

External links

WORMS

Malacostraca
Marine crustaceans of New Zealand